Newcastle is a metropolitan area and the second-most-populated city in the state of New South Wales, Australia. It includes the Newcastle and Lake Macquarie local government areas, and is the hub of the Greater Newcastle area, which includes most parts of the local government areas of City of Newcastle, City of Lake Macquarie, City of Cessnock, City of Maitland and Port Stephens Council.

Located at the mouth of the Hunter River, it is the predominant city within the Hunter Region. Famous for its coal, Newcastle is the largest coal exporting harbour in the world, exporting 159.9 million tonnes of coal in 2017. Beyond the city, the Hunter Region possesses large coal deposits. Geologically, the area is located in the central-eastern part of the Sydney Basin.

History

Aboriginal history
Newcastle and the lower Hunter Region were traditionally occupied by the Awabakal and Worimi Aboriginal people, who called the area Malubimba.

Based on Aboriginal-language references documented in maps, sketches and geological descriptions, eight landmarks have been officially dual-named by the NSW Geographic Names Board with their traditional Aboriginal names. They include Nobbys Head also known as Whibayganba; Flagstaff Hill also known as Tahlbihn; Pirate Point also known as Burrabihngarn; Port Hunter also known as Yohaaba; Hunter River (South Channel) also known as Coquun;
Shepherds Hill also known as Khanterin; Ironbark Creek also known as Toohrnbing and Hexham Swamp also known as Burraghihnbihng.

European settlement

In September 1797, Lieutenant John Shortland became the first European settler to explore the area. His discovery of the area was largely accidental; as he had been sent in search of a number of convicts who had seized a locally built vessel called Cumberland as she was sailing from Sydney Cove. While returning, Lt. Shortland entered what he later described as "a very fine river", which he named after New South Wales' Governor John Hunter. He returned with reports of the deep-water port and the area's abundant coal. Over the next two years, coal mined from the area was the New South Wales colony's first export.

Newcastle gained a reputation as a "hellhole" as it was a place where the most dangerous convicts were sent to dig in the coal mines as harsh punishment for their crimes. By the start of the 19th century the mouth of the Hunter River was being visited by diverse groups of men, including coal diggers, timber-cutters, and more escaped convicts. Philip Gidley King, the Governor of New South Wales from 1800, decided on a more positive approach to exploit the now obvious natural resources of the Hunter Valley. In 1801, a convict camp called King's Town (named after Governor King) was established to mine coal and cut timber. In the same year, the first shipment of coal was dispatched to Sydney. This settlement closed less than a year later.

A settlement was again attempted in 1804, as a place of secondary punishment for unruly convicts. The settlement was named Coal River, also Kingstown and then renamed Newcastle, after the English city. The new settlement, comprising convicts and a military guard, arrived at the Hunter River on 27 March 1804 in three ships: , the Resource and the James. The convicts were rebels from the 1804 Castle Hill convict rebellion. The link with Newcastle upon Tyne, England (its namesake) and also whence many of the 19th-century coal miners came, is still obvious in some of the place-names—such as Jesmond, Hexham, Wickham, Wallsend and Gateshead. Morpeth, New South Wales is a similar distance north of Newcastle as Morpeth, Northumberland is north of Newcastle upon Tyne.

Under Captain James Wallis, commandant from 1815 to 1818, the convicts' conditions improved, and a building boom began. Captain Wallis laid out the streets of the town, built the first church of the site of the present Christ Church Anglican Cathedral, erected the old gaol on the seashore, and began work on the breakwater which now joins Nobbys Head to the mainland. The quality of these first buildings was poor, and only the (much reinforced) breakwater survives. During this period, in 1816, the oldest public school in Australia was built in East Newcastle.

Newcastle remained a penal settlement until 1822, when the settlement was opened up to farming. As a penal colony, the military rule was harsh, especially at Limeburners' Bay, on the inner side of Stockton peninsula. There, convicts were sent to burn oyster shells for making lime. Military rule in Newcastle ended in 1823. Prisoner numbers were reduced to 100 (most of these were employed on the building of the breakwater), and the remaining 900 were sent to Port Macquarie.

Civilian government and onwards

After removal of the last convicts in 1823, the town was freed from the infamous influence of the penal law. It began to acquire the aspect of a typical Australian pioneer settlement, and a steady flow of free settlers poured into the hinterland.

During the nineteenth century the formation of the Newcastle & Hunter River Steamship Company saw the establishment of regular steamship services from Morpeth and Newcastle with Sydney. The company had a fleet of freighters as well as several fast passenger vessels, including the PS Newcastle and the PS Namoi. The Namoi had first-class cabins with the latest facilities.

Because of the coal supply, small ships plied between Newcastle and Sydney, Brisbane, Melbourne and Adelaide, carrying coal to gas works and bunkers for shipping, and railways. These were commonly known as sixty-milers, referring to the nautical journey between Newcastle and Sydney. These ships continued in service until recent times.

1920s to present

During World War II, Newcastle was an important industrial centre for the Australian war effort. In 1942, the Japanese planned to attack Sydney Harbour. On the early hours of 8 June, the Japanese submarine  briefly shelled Newcastle. Among the areas hit within the city were dockyards, the steel works, Parnell Place in the city's East End, the breakwall and Art Deco ocean baths. There were no casualties in the attack and damage was minimal.

The Port of Newcastle remains the economic and trade centre for the resource-rich Hunter Valley and for much of the north and north-west of New South Wales. Newcastle is the world's largest coal export port and Australia's oldest and second-largest tonnage throughput port, with over 3,000 shipping movements handling cargo of 95.8 Mt per annum, of which coal exports represented 90.8 Mt in 2008–09. The volume of coal exported, and attempts to increase coal exports, are opposed by environmental groups.
Newcastle had a shipbuilding industry with the Walsh Island Dockyard & Engineering Works, State Dockyard and Forgacs Shipyard. In recent years the only major ship-construction contract awarded to the area was the construction of the Huon-class minehunters. The era of extensive heavy industry passed when the steel works closed in 1999. Many of the remaining manufacturing industries have located themselves well away from the city itself.

Newcastle has one of the oldest theatre districts in Australia. Victoria Theatre on Perkins Street is the oldest purpose-built theatre in the country. The theatre district that occupied the area around what is now the Hunter Street Mall vanished during the 1940s. The old city centre has seen some new apartments and hotels built in recent years, but the rate of commercial and retail occupation remains low while alternate suburban centres have become more important. The CBD itself is shifting to the west, towards the major urban renewal area known as "Honeysuckle". This renewal, to run for another 10 years, is a major part of arresting the shift of business and residents to the suburbs. Commercial renewal has been accompanied by cultural renaissance. There is a vibrant arts scene in the city including a highly regarded art gallery, and an active Hunter Writers' Centre. Recent fictional representations (for example Antoinette Eklund's 'Steel River') present a new vision of the city, using the city's historic past as a backdrop for contemporary fiction.

The old central business district, located at Newcastle's eastern end, still has a considerable number of historic buildings, dominated by Christ Church Cathedral, seat of the Anglican Bishop of Newcastle. Other noteworthy buildings include Fort Scratchley, the Ocean Baths, the old Customs House, the 1920s City Hall, the 1890s Longworth Institute (once regarded as the finest building in the colony) and the 1930s art deco University House (formerly NESCA House, seen in the film Superman Returns).

Heritage listings

Newcastle has a number of heritage-listed sites, including:

 Argyle Street: Argyle House
 48–50 Bolton Street: David Cohen & Co. Warehouse
 58 Bolton Street: Old Newcastle East Public School
 Bond Street: Coutt's Sailors Home
 1 Bond Street: Newcastle Customs House
 51 Brown Street: Newcastle Reservoirs
 Church Street: Church and Watt Street Terrace Group
 9 Church Street: Newcastle Court House
 Great Northern railway: Honeysuckle Point Railway Workshops
 Great Northern railway: Newcastle railway station
 21 Hillcrest Road: The Ridge
 45 Hunter Street: T & G Mutual Life Assurance Building
 96 Hunter Street: Newcastle Post Office
 359–361 Hunter Street: Frederick Ash Building
 289 King Street: Newcastle City Hall
 300 King Street: Nesca House
 434 King Street, Newcastle West: Miss Porter's House
 Nobby's Road: Coal River Precinct
 Pacific Street: Old Newcastle Club Building
 8–10 Perkins Street: Victoria Theatre
 89 Scott Street: Great Northern Hotel
 98 Scott Street: Convict Lumber Yard
 Shortland Esplande: Bogey Hole
 41 The Terrace: Shepherds Hill military installations
 35–37 Watt Street: Manufacturers House
 72 Watt Street: Newcastle Government House

Economy

19th and early 20th centuries

Coal
Coal mining began in earnest on 3 May 1833 when the Australian Agricultural Company received land grants at Newcastle plus a 31-year monopoly on that town's coal traffic. Other collieries were within a  radius of the town. Principal coal mines were located at Stockton, Tighes Hill, Carrington and the Newcastle Coal and Copper Company's collieries at Merewether (includes the Glebe), Wallsend and the Waratah collieries. All operations had closed by the early 1960s.

On 10 December 1831 the Australian Agricultural Company officially opened Australia's first railway, at the intersection of Brown & Church Streets, Newcastle. Privately owned and operated to service the A Pit coal mine, it was a cast-iron fishbelly rail on an inclined plane as a gravitational railway.

Copper
In the 1850s, a major copper smelting works was established at Burwood, near Merewether. An engraving of this appeared in The Illustrated London News on 11 February 1854. The English and Australian Copper Company built another substantial works at Broadmeadow circa 1890, and in that decade the Cockle Creek Smelter was built.

Soap
The largest factory of its kind in the Southern Hemisphere was constructed in 1885, on an  site between the suburbs of Tighes Hill and Port Waratah, by Charles Upfold, from London, for his Sydney Soap and Candle Company, to replace a smaller factory in Wickham. Their soap products won 17 medals at International Exhibitions. At the Sydney International Exhibition they won a bronze medal "against all-comers from every part of the world", the only first prize awarded for soap and candles. Following World War I the company was sold to Messrs Lever & Kitchen (today Unilever), and the factory closed in the mid-1930s.

Steel
In 1911, BHP chose the city as the site for its steelworks due to the abundance of coal. The land put aside was prime real estate, on the southern edge of the harbour. In 1915, the BHP steelworks opened, beginning a period of some 80 years dominating the steel works and heavy industry. As Mayfield and the suburbs surrounding the steelworks declined in popularity because of pollution, the steelworks thrived, becoming the region's largest employer.

Economic challenges

Newcastle as a traditional area of heavy industry was not immune from the effects of economic downturns that plagued New South Wales and wider Australia since the 1970s. These downturns were particularly hard hitting for heavy industry which was particularly prevalent in Newcastle. The early 1990s recession caused significant job losses across Australia and the Newcastle region experienced a peak unemployment rate of 17% in February 1993, compared to 12.1% in New South Wales and 11.9% across Australia. As Australia recovered from the early-1990s recession, the economy of Newcastle did too and the jobless rate rapidly fell. However, it consistently remained above that of New South Wales.

In 1999, the steelworks closed after 84 years' operation and had employed about 50,000 during its existence, many for decades. The closure of the BHP steelworks occurred at a time of strong economic expansion in Australia. At the time of the closure and since the closure Newcastle experienced a significant amount of economic diversification which has strengthened the local economy. Despite this, the closure caused a deterioration of the employment situation in Newcastle where the unemployment rate rose rapidly to almost 12% from under 9% at the previous trough just prior to the closure.

Since 2003, Australia experienced the effects of the 2000s commodities boom as commodities prices for major export good such as coal and iron ore rose significantly. This provided a large incentive for investment in the Newcastle and Hunter region due to its status as a major coal mining and export hub to Asian markets. Large projects related to the coal industry helped to propel the Newcastle unemployment rate to 20 year lows and allow the Newcastle region to weather the effects of the late 2000s recession better than NSW as a whole. As of 2009 the two largest single employers are the Hunter New England Area Health Service and the University of Newcastle. The National Stock Exchange of Australia (formerly Newcastle Stock Exchange) was formerly based in the city.

Disasters

1989 earthquake

On 28 December 1989, Newcastle experienced an earthquake measuring 5.6 on the Richter scale, which killed 13 people, injured 162 and destroyed or severely damaged a number of prominent buildings. Some had to be demolished, including the large George Hotel in Scott Street (city), the Century Theatre at Broadmeadow, the Hunter Theatre (formerly 'The Star') and the majority of The Junction school at Merewether. Part of the Newcastle Workers' Club, a popular venue, was destroyed and later replaced by a new structure. The following economic recession of the early 1990s meant that the city took several years to recover.
However, Beaumont Street, Hamilton, where many buildings sustained major damage, became a thriving cosmopolitan restaurant strip after the earthquake and is still going strong today. The earthquake helped to rekindle business in this suburban strip.

June 2007 Hunter Region and Central Coast storms

On 8 June 2007 the Hunter and Central Coast regions were battered by the worst series of storms to hit New South Wales in 30 years. This resulted in extensive flooding and nine deaths. Thousands of homes were flooded and many were destroyed. The Hunter and Central Coast regions were declared natural disaster areas by the State Premier, Morris Iemma, on 8 June 2007. Further flooding was predicted by the Bureau of Meteorology but was less severe than predicted.

During the early stages of the storms, the  bulk carrier ship  ran aground at Nobbys Beach after failing to heed warnings to move offshore. After the first few attempts failed, the Pasha Bulker was refloated on the third salvage attempt on 2 July 2007 despite earlier fears that the ship would break up. After initially entering the port for minor repairs, it departed under tow on 26 July 2007 for major repairs in Asia.

Maritime
Sixty people died; coincidentally, one survivor, Frederick Hedges, was plucked from the water by the sole survivor of the Dunbar that had sunk in Sydney Harbour nine years earlier.

The most tragic maritime accident of the 20th century in Newcastle occurred on 9 August 1934 when the Stockton-bound ferry Bluebell collided with the coastal freighter, Waraneen, and sank in the middle of the Hunter River. The Bluebell Collision claimed three lives and fifteen passengers were admitted to the Newcastle Hospital, with two suffering severely from the effects of immersion. It was later found that the ferry captain was at fault.

Aviation
On 16 August 1966, an RAAF CAC Sabre crashed into the inner-city suburb of The Junction. The pilot, Flying Officer Warren William Goddard, experienced engine troubles and unsuccessfully tried to get the plane over the Pacific Ocean. The Junction is a highly populated suburb of Newcastle and most of the plane wreckage landed in the shopping area of the suburb. In 2007 a memorial plaque was unveiled for the killed pilot.

Geography
Newcastle is on the southern bank of the Hunter River mouth. The northern side is dominated by sand dunes, swamps and multiple river channels. A "green belt" protecting plant and wildlife flanks the city from the west (Watagan mountains) around to the north where it meets the coast just north of Stockton. Urban development is mainly restricted to the hilly southern bank. The small town of Stockton sits opposite central Newcastle at the river mouth and is linked by ferry. Much of the city is undercut by the coal measures of the Sydney sedimentary basin, and what were once numerous coal-mining villages located in the hills and valleys around the port have merged into a single urban area extending southwards to Lake Macquarie.

Parks

Newcastle has several public parks including King Edward Park, which was designated in 1863. Features of the park include coastal views, a sunken garden and a Victorian rotunda.
Another noteworthy park of Newcastle is Starrett Park in New Lambton, known for its playground and lush grass.

Climate
Newcastle has a humid subtropical climate (Cfa) that is typical of the Australian east coast. Precipitation is heaviest in late autumn and early winter, while the second half of the year is slightly drier on average. The climate is generally moderated by the Pacific Ocean to the east.

Winters are generally mild with drier conditions than summer on average. Cold fronts affect the area and sometimes bring strong westerly winds behind them, but due to the foehn effect they generally provide clear conditions as the region lies leeward of the Great Dividing Range. East coast lows also impact Newcastle, sometimes delivering winds well above  and torrential rainfall, usually lasting a couple of days. The east coast low in May 1974, the June 2007 Hunter Region and Central Coast storms and April 2015 are extreme examples of this type of weather.

Demographics

The metropolitan area of Newcastle is the second-most-populous area in New South Wales.
  
In the 2021 Australian Census updated population figures on the Newcastle and Hunter Region were provided. What is generally labeled as the 'Greater Newcastle Area' includes the LGAs of Newcastle, Lake Macquarie, Maitland, Cessnock and Port Stephens. In 2021 this region had a total population of 619,653.

Of people in the Newcastle metropolitan area, 83.6 per cent were born in Australia. The next most common countries of birth were England 2.3%, New Zealand 1.0%, China 0.7%, India 0.5% and Philippines 0.4%. Aboriginal and Torres Strait Islander people made up 3.8% of the population. 88.2% of people spoke only English at home. Other languages spoken at home included Mandarin 0.7%, Macedonian 0.5%, Italian 0.4%, Greek 0.3% and Cantonese 0.3%. The most common responses for religion in Newcastle were No Religion 31.1%, Catholic 21.7% and Anglican 19.2%.

Newcastle is often quoted as being the seventh-largest city in Australia. This is misleading as the area represented extends well beyond both the City of Newcastle and the Newcastle metropolitan area. The area, officially the Newcastle Statistical District, is referred to as Greater Newcastle or the Lower Hunter Region, which includes most parts of the Newcastle, Lake Macquarie, Cessnock, Maitland and Port Stephens local government areas and, as of 30 June 2009, has an estimated population of 540,796. Despite their proximity, all of the LGAs in the region maintain their own individual identities, separate from Newcastle.

The demonym for the people of Newcastle is "Novocastrian", derived from Latin novus (new) and castra (castle or fort).

Domestic architecture

Education

Primary and secondary schools

The oldest state school in the area is Newcastle East Public School, a primary school established in 1816. Newcastle East Public School is the oldest continuously operating school in Australia, and celebrated its bicentenary in 2016.

Newcastle High School, which was formed by the merger of three schools, traces its lineage to a secondary school section initially founded on the grounds of Newcastle East Public School.

There are three selective state schools in the area:
Hunter School of the Performing Arts, a fully selective 3-12 school, taking students only by audition
Merewether High School, a fully selective high school in the suburb of Broadmeadow
Hunter Sports High School, a partially selective sporting high school, accepting around half its students from the local area and around half by audition

The two main independent schools in Newcastle are Newcastle Grammar School and St Philip's Christian College, both coeducational K-12 schools.

The local area is also home to two Steiner schools: the Newcastle Waldorf School at Glendale in Lake Macquarie, and the Linuwel Steiner School in East Maitland.

Tertiary and further education
The city's main provider of tertiary education is the University of Newcastle. It was established in 1951 as a satellite campus of the University of New South Wales and obtained autonomy in 1965. The university now offers over 150 undergraduate and graduate courses to a student population of more than 38,000, including 7,000 international students from more than 113 countries.

There are three campuses of the Hunter Institute of TAFE, one located in the Newcastle CBD, one in the suburb of Hamilton East and the other located in the suburb of Tighes Hill. The Tighes Hill campus is the network's largest campus and offers courses in business, hospitality and various trades.

Culture

Festivals
Newcastle holds a variety of cultural events and festivals.

The Newcastle Regional Show is held in the Newcastle Showground annually. There are a mixture of typical regional show elements such as woodchopping displays, showbags, rides and stalls and usually fireworks to complement the events in the main arena.

The Mattara festival, founded in 1961, is the official festival of Newcastle with a more traditional "country fair" type program that combines a parade, rides, sporting events, band competitions and portrait and landscape painting exhibitions. Mattara means "hand of friendship" in the local Awabakal language. Originally held at Civic Park and then moved to Newcastle foreshore in 2006 In 2017 the festival was moved to Wallsend Park.

The Newcastle Jazz Festival is held across three days in August, and attracts performers and audiences from all over Australia. The first festival was held in September 1988 as part the NSW Bicentenital Festival of Music which was organised by the Newcastle Jazz Action Society.

The Shoot Out 24 Hour Filmmaking Festival, first started in Newcastle in 1999. This is the film festival where film-makers come together in one place to make a short film in 24 hours. It is run annually in July.

This Is Not Art is a national festival of new media and arts held in Newcastle each year over the October long weekend. Since its humble beginnings in 1998, it has become one of the leading arts festivals in Australia dedicated to the work and ideas of communities not included in other major Australian arts festivals. The umbrella program includes the independent festivals Electrofringe, the National Young Writers' Festival, Critical Animals, Sound Summit, Crack Theatre Festival and other projects that vary from year to year.

The Newcastle Entertainment Centre, located inside the Newcastle Showground is a popular venue for regular events including wrestling, concerts and monster truck shows.

Music
Newcastle has an active youth music culture, as well as a Conservatorium of Music which is part of the University of Newcastle. It continues to support local bands and has a large underground music scene. The members of Silverchair, the highly successful Australian band, hail from Newcastle, as do the Australian bands The Screaming Jets and Vacations. It has a fertile punk rock and hardcore scene, which has spawned successful local acts and national acts. Newcastle was also home to the short-lived band Velvet Underground which featured future AC/DC guitarist Malcolm Young.

Visual arts and galleries
Notable modernist artists associated with Newcastle are seascape sketcher Shay Docking (1928–1998), the cubist-influenced abstract painter William Rose (1929–1999), landscape painter John Olsen, who was born in Newcastle in 1928, still-life painter Margaret Olley, portraitist William Dobell and figurative painter John Montefiore lived at Lake Macquarie to the south of the city. Art collector William Bowmore resided in Newcastle and collected Brett Whiteley paintings as well as owning a large collection of international art and artefacts. The Von Bertouch Galleries was a commercial gallery founded by Anne Von Bertouch and for more than forty years from 1963 exhibited nationally and locally known artists.

The Newcastle Art Gallery is home to one of Australia's most substantial public art collections outside a major capital city, and its extensive collection of works by contemporary and historical Australian visual artists presents an overview of Australian art. Due to an ongoing space issue, the gallery is planning a major redevelopment. The Lock Up is a multidisciplinary contemporary art space located in the inner city and hosts local, national and international artists to exhibit in the historic former Newcastle Police station.

Theatre
Newcastle has a variety of smaller theatres, but the main theatre in the CBD is now the Civic, at Wheeler Place, (seating capacity about 1,500), one of Australia's great historic theatres built during 1929 in Art Deco style. It hosts a wide range of musicals, plays, concerts, dance and other events each year. Newcastle previously boasted several large theatres, among them the oldest purpose-built theatre in Australia, the Victoria Theatre on Perkins Street (built 1876, capacity 1,750), saw touring international opera companies such as the D'Oyly Carte Opera Company, and other troupes, and played host to some of the greatest stars of the age, such as Dame Nellie Melba, Gladys Moncrieff and Richard Tauber (it is now closed and derelict); the Century, Nineways, Broadmeadow (built 1941, capacity 1,800)—although largely used as a cinema—was a popular Symphony orchestra venue (demolished 1990 after being severely damaged by the 1989 earthquake); the Hunter (capacity 1,000) at The Junction, had advanced modern stage facilities, but was eventually sold and demolished to make way for a motel that was destroyed by the 1989 earthquake. The decline in theatres and cinemas from the 1960s onwards was blamed on television.

Newcastle has also been home to noted Australian actors, comedians and entertainers, including Sarah Wynter, John Doyle (part of comic act Roy & HG), Susie Porter, Celia Ireland, Yahoo Serious and Jonathan Biggins. The cast of the Tap Dogs show also come from Newcastle.

Media arts
Newcastle is home to the Octapod Association, a New Media Arts collective established in 1996. Octapod presents the annual This Is Not Art Festival and is also home to the Podspace Gallery.

Museums
The Newcastle Museum was founded in 1988 in the former headquarters of the Great Northern Railway and stewards local history, culture, industry and science. It features permanent exhibitions relating to coal mining and steel production, Aboriginal history and the area's history, as well as a hands-on science centre.

Sport

Basketball
Newcastle has had two teams in the National Basketball League, the Newcastle Falcons and the Hunter Pirates. Both teams folded due to financial difficulties. The city co-hosted the 1985 FIBA Oceania Championship where Australia's national basketball team won its seventh straight title.

Cricket
A bid for Newcastle to establish a 2012 team in the national Twenty20 competition the Big Bash League, with games played at either Hunter Stadium or No.1 Sports Ground was unsuccessful.

Football
Several different football codes are popular sports in Newcastle, with at least one having been played since the mid-1800s.

Australian rules
The sport of Australian rules is played in Newcastle and administered by AFL Hunter Central Coast.

Rugby league
Newcastle has a rugby league team playing in the national competition. The Newcastle Knights play in the National Rugby League.

The Newcastle Rugby League holds local club competition and has done so since the early 1900s. Touring domestic and international teams would play against Newcastle's representative team which was made up of players from this league. The Newcastle & Hunter Rugby League is a community competition also based in the region which was created from a merger in 2007 of leagues which ran under various names since the mid-20th century, and is the largest community rugby league competition anywhere in the world. It generally features smaller teams compared to the Newcastle Rugby League.

McDonald Jones Stadium hosted the 2016 Anzac Test between Australia and New Zealand.

Rugby union
Rugby union is a football code that has been played in Newcastle since at least 1869, with the Newcastle Football Club formed in 1877. Newcastle and Hunter Rugby Union is the main body overseeing the sport in the region. In 2019, the New South Wales Waratahs of the professional Super Rugby competition played a competition match in Newcastle at Hunter Stadium for the first time.

Soccer (association football)

The Newcastle Jets Football Club, which plays in Australia's highest-level soccer competition, the A-League, also play at McDonald Jones Stadium. The Newcastle Jets won the A-League competition in their third season, defeating local rivals the Central Coast Mariners in the grand final.

The city also played host to 4 games of the 2015 AFC Asian Cup, including the semi-final between Australia and the United Arab Emirates, as well as the third-place playoff between the United Arab Emirates and Iraq.

Horse racing

Newcastle Racecourse is in the suburb of Broadmeadow. It is home to the Newcastle Jockey Club, established in 1907, which  races 35 times annually at the spacious  turf track with a  home straight. It is the venue for three Group 3 races: in March is the  Newcastle Newmarket Handicap; and in September the 1,400-metre Cameron Handicap, and the  Newcastle Gold Cup. In 2015 work an inner track, known as the Beaumont Track, was added.

Aboriginal jockey Merv Maynard commenced his career at Newcastle Racecourse, under Keith Tinson. Maynard enjoyed his first success in the 1948–49 season there, and went on to have a career spanning 50 years, winning the Newcastle Premiership twice, along with 1,500 winning rides in four countries.

Ice hockey and skating
The Newcastle North Stars are Newcastle's representatives in the Australian Ice Hockey League championships. Originally based in Newcastle West in the 1970 and '80s, the North Stars now play out of the Hunter Ice Skating Stadium in Warners Bay.

Motorsport

Newcastle hosted the final round of the Supercars Championship in 2017. The Newcastle 500 is held on the Newcastle Street Circuit in the East End of the city. The city previously hosted the Mattara Hillclimb which was held in King Edward Park, and has hosted the F1 Offshore Powerboats in the harbour.

Netball
The Hunter Jaegers (Commonwealth Bank Trophy – Netball) were based at the Newcastle Entertainment Centre. They became defunct in 2007 after merging with the Sydney Swifts to become the New South Wales Swifts. Officially opened in June 1992, the Entertainment Centre offers 5,000 square metres of clear-span floor space and is capable of catering for capacities from 2,000 to 6,500 for entertainment-style events. The Centre was built to house the now-defunct Newcastle Falcons National Basketball League team and was also home to the Hunter Pirates before a lack of sponsorship forced them to close after the 2005–06 season, with the licence sold to the Singapore Slingers. The Slingers played one home game at the Centre during the 2006–07 season.

Water sports

Newcastle has an abundance of beaches and surf breaks for which the city is internationally well known. Newcastle hosts the annual surfing contest Surfest on the world professional surfing tour. Four-time world champion surfer Mark Richards grew up surfing at Newcastle's Merewether Beach, and is a local icon, appearing at many local functions, and supporting local charities. Nobbys Beach is a very popular kitesurfing spot, especially during the warm summer months when there are north-easterly sea breezes.

Media
Newcastle is served by a daily tabloid, The Herald (formerly The Newcastle Morning Herald and Miners' Advocate and then The Newcastle Herald), several weeklies including the Newcastle Star, The Post and the bi-monthly The Hunter Advocate.

Other alternative media in the city include the university's student publications Opus and Yak magazine, Newcastle Mirage (a local arts and culture zine) and Urchin (a zine published by the media and arts organisation Octapod).

The city is also served by several local radio stations, including those owned by the Australian Broadcasting Corporation and SBS.
AM stations
 2HD (commercial) 1143 AM
 Radio 1629 Newcastle (off band commercial) 1629 AM
FM stations
Triple M Newcastle (commercial) 102.9 FM
 hit106.9 Newcastle (commercial) 106.9 FM
 New FM (commercial) 105.3 FM
 2NUR (community) 103.7 FM
 Rhema FM Newcastle (Christian) 99.7 FM
Government broadcasters
 Australian Broadcasting Corporation
 ABC Newcastle local radio 1233 AM
 ABC Radio National 1512 AM
 ABC NewsRadio (news and Parliament) 1458 AM
 Triple J (youth station) 102.1 FM
 ABC Classic FM (classical music) 106.1 FM
 Special Broadcasting Service
 SBS Radio (foreign-language service) 1413 AM
Narrowcast stations
 Sky Sports Radio (as part of statewide network) 1341 AM
 Newy 87.8 FM
 Raw FM 88.0 FM
Newcastle is also served by five television networks, three commercial and two national services:

 Nine Northern NSW – Nine Network owned and operated. Pre-aggregation, NBN Television was the incumbent commercial station in the Newcastle region.
 WIN Television's 10 Northern NSW – Network 10 affiliate
 Seven Northern NSW – Seven Network owned and operated
 ABC Television
 SBS Television

NBN produces an evening news bulletin combining local, state, national and international news screening nightly at 6:00 pm on Channel 9, due to NBN being an owner and operator of the network, Nine News' Sydney-based bulletin at 6 pm is not relayed on this station, but stories from the bulletin are shown on NBN News. Seven, Nine and WIN Television produce short local updates throughout the day to fulfil local content quotas.

Transport
Like most major cities, the Newcastle metropolitan area has an extensive system of both road links and road based public transport services (bus, taxi etc.) which cover most areas of both Newcastle and Lake Macquarie and which extend beyond the metropolitan area itself. Rail transport, however, is accessible to only a relatively small percentage of the population along the major rail transport routes and ferry services are restricted to those commuting between Newcastle and Stockton. Within the metropolitan area the car remains the dominant form of transportation. At the time of the 2001 Census, fewer than 4% of the population caught public transport, of which around 2.5% travelled by bus and 1% used the train or ferry to commute to work. On the other hand, over 72% of the population travelled by car to and from work. Newcastle, like all major Australian urban centres, had a tram system, but it was closed in 1950. In February 2019, trams returned to the city with the opening of the Newcastle Light Rail.

Road
Newcastle is connected to surrounding cities by the Pacific Motorway (south), Hunter Expressway (west), New England Highway (west) and the Pacific Highway (north and south). Hunter Street is the main shopping street in the Newcastle CBD and, along with King Street, is one of the major links to the Pacific Highway from the CBD. King Street provides direct access to the Newcastle Link Road and then the Pacific Motorway and Hunter Expressway.

Bus

Bus services within Newcastle are operated by Newcastle Transport. Prior to July 2017, these were operated by Newcastle Buses & Ferries. Hunter Valley Buses, Port Stephens Coaches and Rover Coaches also operate services into the CBD from other parts of the Hunter Region.

The network radiates from a bus terminal near Newcastle railway station, on the waterfront of Newcastle's CBD. Major interchanges are located at the University of Newcastle, Wallsend, Glendale, Warners Bay, Belmont, Charlestown Square and Westfield Kotara.

Greyhound Australia, Premier Motor Service and Sid Fogg's long-distance services serve Newcastle.

Rail

The Newcastle area is serviced by two NSW TrainLink intercity lines providing local and regional commuter services terminating at Newcastle Interchange along the Newcastle line. The Central Coast & Newcastle Line has twice-hourly train services to Sydney and the Central Coast. The Hunter Line has twice-hourly services to Maitland and less frequently to Scone and Dungog. Two long-distance lines operate through the Newcastle area using Broadmeadow station. These provide services to Moree, Armidale, Brisbane and Sydney.

Newcastle once had rail passenger services to Belmont and Toronto, on Lake Macquarie, Wallsend, Kurri Kurri and several towns and villages between Maitland and Cessnock on the South Maitland Railway, but these lines have been closed. In the late-1990s there was intense debate about the future of the rail line into central Newcastle.

In December 2014, the Newcastle line was curtailed to Hamilton. A new Newcastle Interchange opened on 15 October 2017. The Newcastle Light Rail line also operates from here.

From 1924 until 1994, Broadmeadow Locomotive Depot was the main railway centre for the Hunter region. Cardiff Locomotive Workshops opened in 1928, primarily as a major repair centre for New South Wales Government Railways locomotives, although it did build twelve 38 class and two 58 class locomotives. Today it is operated by Downer Rail and along with UGL Rail's Broadmeadow plant, remains active as a locomotive and rolling stock manufacturer and repairer.

Water

The Port of Newcastle is crucial to the economic life of Newcastle and the Hunter Valley region beyond. Over 90 million tonnes of coal is shipped through the facility each year—making it the largest coal exporting port in the world. The Port of Newcastle claims to be Australia's first port. Coal was first exported from the harbour in 1799.

Newcastle Transport operates a ferry service across the Hunter River between Newcastle's CBD and Stockton.

Air

The airport, which is a joint venture between Newcastle City Council and Port Stephens Council, has experienced rapid growth since 2000 as a result of an increase in low-cost airline operations. The airport is located at RAAF Base Williamtown, a Royal Australian Air Force base on land leased from the Department of Defence.

Newcastle Heliport operates alongside the lower section of Newcastle Harbour.

The suburb of Broadmeadow is home to the base of the Westpac Life Saver Rescue Helicopter Service. The Helicopter service is one of the longest running services of this type in the world. Two helicopters operate out of this base and operate 24 hours a day.

Twin towns – sister cities
  Newcastle upon Tyne, England
  Pohang, North Gyeongsang, South Korea
  Ube, Yamaguchi, Japan
  Arcadia, California, United States

See also
List of suburbs in Greater Newcastle, New South Wales

References

Further reading

 Docherty, James Cairns, Newcastle – The Making of an Australian City, Sydney, 1983, 
 Susan Marsden, Coals to Newcastle: a History of Coal Loading at the Port of Newcastle New South Wales 1977–1997  2002
 Marsden, Susan, Newcastle: a Brief History Newcastle, 2004 
 Marsden, Susan, 'Waterfront alive: life on the waterfront', in C Hunter, ed, River Change: six new histories of the Hunter, Newcastle, 1998 
 Morrison James, Ron, Newcastle – Times Past, Newcastle, 2005 (P/B), 
 Greater Newcastle City Council, Newcastle 150 Years, 1947.
 Thorne, Ross, Picture Palace Architecture in Australia, Melbourne, Victoria, 1976 (P/B), 
 Turner, Dr. John W., Manufacturing in Newcastle, Newcastle, 1980,

External links

 Newcastle City Council
 Newcastle Visitor Centre
 
 Newcastle Region Art Gallery
 VisitNSW.com – Newcastle

 
1804 establishments in Australia
Port cities in New South Wales
Populated places established in 1797
Suburbs of Newcastle, New South Wales
Hunter River (New South Wales)